Guinecourt is a commune in the Pas-de-Calais department in the Hauts-de-France region of France.

Geography

Population

Places of interest
 An eighteenth-century manor house.

See also
Communes of the Pas-de-Calais department

References

External links

Communes of Pas-de-Calais